The Ecuadorian National Road Championships are held annually to decide the cycling champions in both the road race and time trial discipline, across various categories.

Men

Road race

Time trial

Women

References 

Cycling in Ecuador